Passy is an area of Paris, France, located in the 16th arrondissement, on the Right Bank. It is adjacent to Auteuil to the southwest, and Chaillot to the northeast.

It is home to many of the city's wealthiest residents, hence its informal grouping in the Neuilly-Auteuil-Passy area. Many embassies are based in Passy.

History

Early history

Passy was originally a village on the outskirts of Paris. The Château de Passy (no longer existing) had been built in 1381. In 1658, hot springs were discovered around which spa facilities were developed. This attracted Parisian society and English visitors, some of whom made the area, which combined attractive countryside with both modest houses and fine residences, their winter retreat. It was dependent on the parish of Auteuil until 1761.

Benjamin Franklin in Passy

The Hôtel de Valentinois (at that time the property of Monsieur de Chaumont) in Passy was the home of Benjamin Franklin during the nine years that he lived in France during the American Revolutionary War, when he represented American interests and sought French support for American independence.

Franklin established a small printing press in his lodgings to print pamphlets and other material as part of his mandate to maintain French support for the revolution. He called it the Passy Press. Among his printing projects, he produced comics he called Bagatelles and passports. He developed a typeface known as "le Franklin". He also printed a 1782 treatise by Pierre-André Gargaz titled A Project of Universal and Perpetual Peace, which laid out a vision for maintaining a permanent peace in Europe. It proposed a central governing council composed of representatives of all the nations of Europe to arbitrate international disputes.

He also worked on his scientific projects at a laboratory he shared with others, which had been installed by Louis XV in the Château de la Muette.

When Franklin returned to America, the new American Ambassador to France, Thomas Jefferson, wrote: "When he left Passy, it seemed as if the village had lost its patriarch."  To this day, a street in Passy bears the name Rue Benjamin Franklin.

After the French Revolution

After the French Revolution, Passy became a commune of Seine. The population was 2,400 in 1836, 4,545 in 1841, but larger in summer. In 1861 the population was 11,431. Passy's population was 17,594 when it was absorbed into Paris along with several other communities in 1860.

Artists of Passy

The painting Albert Gleizes painting Les ponts de Paris (Passy), The Bridges of Paris (Passy), housed in the collection of the Museum Moderner Kunst (mumok), Vienna, refers to the spirit of solidarity among the newly formed "Artists of Passy", during a time when factions had begun to develop within Cubism. Les Artistes de Passy consisted of a diverse grouping of avant-garde artistes (painters, sculptors and poets), including several who previously held meetings in 1910 at the rue Visconti studio of Henri Le Fauconnier. Their first diner presided over by neo-symbolist Paul Fort was held at the house of Balzac, rue Raynouard, in the presence of Guillaume Apollinaire, Raymond Duchamp-Villon, Marie Laurencin, Henri Le Fauconnier, Fernand Léger, André Mare, Jean Metzinger, Francis Picabia, Henry Valensi, and Jacques Villon.<ref>[http://www.larousse.fr/archives/grande-encyclopedie/page/3910 Cubisme, 1912", Archives, Grande Encyclopédie Larousse]</ref> Albert Gleizes chose Passy as the subject of this painting.

Landmarks
Passy is home to the Musée Marmottan Monet, housed in the Château de la Muette, and the Jardin du Ranelagh park. It is served by the Ranelagh metro station.

There is now a rue Benjamin Franklin and a square de Yorktown near the Trocadéro.

A lively street in the area is Rue de Passy, which goes from La Muette to the Place de Costa Rica just behind the Trocadéro.  It has boutiques and chain stores along its length.

The Cimetière de Passy, located at 2, rue du Commandant Schœlsing, is the burial place for many well-known persons including American silent film star Pearl White, the painters Édouard Manet and Berthe Morisot, and composer Claude Debussy.

Honoré de Balzac lived in Passy for over six years, and his house is now a museum (Maison de Balzac).

The apartment in which Marlon Brando trysts with Maria Schneider in Bernardo Bertolucci's 1972 film Last Tango in Paris'' was located in Passy.

Notable people
Alexandre Le Riche de La Poupelinière (1693–1762), French tax farmer and music patron
Niccolò Piccinni (1728–1800), Italian composer
Louis-Guillaume Le Veillard (1733–1794), aristocrat
Princess Marie Louise of Savoy (1749–1792), Savoyan princess
General Charles Edward Jennings de Kilmaine (1751–1799), Irish soldier and revolutionary
Seymour Fleming (1758–1818), British noblewoman
Pierre Baillot (1771–1842), French violinist and composer
Jean François Boissonade de Fontarabie (Paris, 12 août 1774 - Passy, 8 septembre 1857), French historian.
Pierre Bretonneau (1778–1862), French medical doctor
Antoine-Henri Jomini (1779–1869), Swiss army officer
Alphonse de Lamartine (1790–1869), French poet and politician
Gioachino Rossini (1792–1868), Italian composer
Paul de Kock (1793–1871), French novelist
Honoré de Balzac (1799–1850), French novelist and playwright
Alfred Des Essarts (1811–1893), French playwright and poet
Marc Bonnehée (1828–1886), French opera singer
Camille Pissarro (1830–1903), French painter
Virginia Oldoini, Countess di Castiglione (1837–1899), Italian aristocrat
Georges Clemenceau (1841–1929), French politician, physician, and journalist
Berthe Morisot (1841–1895), French painter
William Kissam Vanderbilt (1849–1920), American businessman
Eugène Demets (1858–1923), French music publisher
Jacques-Emile Blanche (1861–1942), French painter
Comtesse de Buyer-Mimeure, the former Miss Daisy Polk  1917), American activist
Léa Seydoux (1985), French actress

See also
 Théodore Année
 Madame Brillon

References

External links

Districts of Paris
16th arrondissement of Paris
Former communes of Seine